Edward Oscar McCowen (June 29, 1877 – November 4, 1953) was a three-term Republican member of the U.S. House of Representatives from Ohio from 1943 to 1949.

Biography 
Edward O. McCowen was born in Bloom Township, Ohio. He attended the public schools of South Webster, Ohio, and graduated from Ohio Northern University at Ada, Ohio, in 1908, Ohio State University at Columbus, Ohio, in 1917, and from the Graduate School of the University of Cincinnati in Cincinnati, Ohio, in 1939. He was successively a high-school teacher, principal, and superintendent. He was the superintendent of the Scioto County public schools from 1914 to 1942. He was [
precinct committeeman and delegate to the Ohio Republican State conventions in 1935 and 1946, and a trustee of Rio Grande College, in Rio Grande, Ohio.

Congress 
McCowen was elected as a Republican to the Seventy-eighth, Seventy-ninth, and Eightieth Congresses. He was an unsuccessful candidate for reelection in 1948 to the Eighty-first Congress.

Death
He returned to Wheelersburg, Ohio, and continued his activity in politics until his death there in 1953. Interment in South Webster Cemetery in South Webster, Ohio.

Sources

The Political Graveyard

1877 births
1953 deaths
Ohio Northern University alumni
Ohio State University alumni
University of Cincinnati alumni
People from Scioto County, Ohio
People from Wheelersburg, Ohio
Republican Party members of the United States House of Representatives from Ohio